Edmund John Zavitz (born July 9, 1875, Ridgeway, Ontario – died December 30, 1968, Brampton, Ontario) is known as the father of reforestation in Ontario.

In his early years, he worked as a general labourer. He later completed his Bachelor of Arts at McMaster University in 1903. It is there that he gained an interest in conservation and reforestation. After studying forestry for a year at Yale University, he graduated from the University of Michigan with the degree of Master of Science in Forestry in 1905. He was then appointed lecturer at the Ontario Agricultural College in Guelph. In 1912, he took a position at the Ontario Ministry of Lands, Forests and Mines as the first provincial forester. In 1924 he rose to the position of Deputy Minister and in 1935 was appointed Chief of Reforestation. He is the author of many landmark reports and handbooks on reforestation. The Forest Fires Prevention Act and the establishment of the provincial air service are attributed to him. A highlight of his noteworthy career was the establishment of the St. Williams tree nursery in 1908, the first of its kind in Ontario. It is there that a plaque commemorating his contributions was placed in 1957.

Key publications 
 Report on the Reforestation of Wastelands in Southern Ontario, 1909
 Hardwood Trees of Ontario, 1959
 E.J. Zavitz Recollections, 1875-1964, a publication of the Department of Lands and Forest of Ontario
 Fifty Years of Reforestation in Ontario, 1961

References

 Autobiography: E.J. Zavitz Recollections, 1875-1964
 Obituary: The Forestry Chronicle, February 1969, http://article.pubs.nrc-cnrc.gc.ca/RPAS/rpv?hm=HInit&afpf=tfc45067-1.pdf&journal=tfc&volume=45

1875 births
1968 deaths
People from Fort Erie, Ontario
Canadian conservationists
Ontario civil servants
Canadian foresters
University of Michigan School of Natural Resources and Environment alumni